A topic-prominent language is a language that organizes its syntax to emphasize the topic–comment structure of the sentence. The term is best known in American linguistics from Charles N. Li and Sandra Thompson, who distinguished topic-prominent languages, such as Korean and Japanese, from subject-prominent languages, such as English.

In Li and Thompson's (1976) view, topic-prominent languages have morphology or syntax that highlights the distinction between the topic and the comment (what is said about the topic). Topic–comment structure may be independent of the syntactic ordering of subject, verb and object.

Common features

Many topic-prominent languages share several syntactic features that have arisen because the languages have sentences that are structured around topics, rather than subjects and objects:

They tend to downplay the role of the passive voice, if a passive construction exists at all, since the main idea of passivization is to turn an object into a subject in languages whose subject is understood to be the topic by default.
They rarely have expletives or "dummy subjects" (pleonastic pronouns) like English it in It's raining.
They often have sentences with so-called "double subjects", actually a topic plus a subject. For example, the following sentence patterns are common in topic-prominent languages:

Mandarin

Japanese

They do not have articles, which are another way of indicating old vs. new information.
The distinction between subject and object is not reliably marked.

The Lolo–Burmese language Lisu has been described as highly topic-prominent, and Sara Rosen has demonstrated that "while every clause has an identifiable topic, it is often impossible to distinguish subject from direct object or agent from patient. There are no diagnostics that reliably identify subjects (or objects) in Lisu."  This ambiguity is demonstrated in the following example:

Examples
Examples of topic-prominent languages include East Asian languages such as Chinese, Japanese, Korean, Vietnamese, Malay, Indonesian, Singaporean English and Malaysian English.  Turkish, Hungarian, Somali, and Native American languages like the Siouan languages are also topic-prominent. Modern linguistic studies have shown that Brazilian Portuguese is a topic-prominent or topic- and subject-prominent language (see Brazilian Portuguese#Topic-prominent language). American Sign Language is also considered to be topic-prominent.

Mandarin Chinese

*Remark: Mandarin Chinese sentences are predominantly SVO, but the language allows the object to be promoted to the topic of the sentence, resulting in an apparently OSV word order.

Japanese

Lakota

Turkish

See also
Topic marker
Topic–comment

References

Linguistic typology
Syntax